Clover High School is a public high school located in Clover, South Carolina, United States, about 28 miles from Charlotte. It is the only high school in the Clover School District. As of the 2019-2020 school year, the principal is Rod Ruth. Clover's feeder schools are Oakridge Middle School and Clover Middle School.

Choir
The 100+ member school choir, the Clover High School Choraliers, have won the State Championship ten times at the South Carolina Choral Concert Festival.

Athletics
 Girls' Tennis 2003 3A State Champions 
 Football 2007 4A Division 2 State Champions 
 Softball 2015 4A State Champions 
 Boys' Soccer 2016 4A State Finalist
 Girls' Basketball 2021 State Champions

Notable alumni
 Lamont Hall, NFL tight end
 Herbert Kirsh, member of South Carolina House of Representatives, 1979–2010
 Nick Sciba, NFL kicker

References

External links
 Clover High School
 Clover School District

Public high schools in South Carolina
Schools in York County, South Carolina